Dougroupalégnaoa (also spelled Dougroupalégnoa and Diligépalényoa) is a town in south-central Ivory Coast. It is a sub-prefecture of Gagnoa Department in Gôh Region, Gôh-Djiboua District.

Dougroupalégnaoa was a commune until March 2012, when it became one of 1126 communes nationwide that were abolished.

In 2014, the population of the sub-prefecture of Dougroupalégnaoa was 47,083.

Villages

The 22 villages of the sub-prefecture of Dougroupalégnaoa and their population in 2014 are:

References

Sub-prefectures of Gôh
Former communes of Ivory Coast